Kasanda (Kassanda) District  is a district in Central Uganda.

Location 
Kassanda district is bordered by Mubende district to the west, Kyankwanzi District to the North, Kiboga District to the Northeast, MItyana District to the East and Southeast, and Gomba District to the South.

References

Districts of Uganda